The 189th Pennsylvania House of Representatives District is located in Northeast Pennsylvania and has been represented since 2023 by Tarah Probst.

District profile
The 189th Pennsylvania House of Representatives District is located in Monroe County and Pike County and is home to the Pennsylvania Welcome Center and the Frazetta Art Museum. It also includes the following areas:

 Monroe County
 Delaware Water Gap
 East Stroudsburg
 Middle Smithfield Township (PART, District East)
 Smithfield Township
 Stroud Township (PART, Districts 01, 03, 06, and 07)
 Stroudsburg
 Pike County
 Delaware Township
 Lehman Township
 Porter Township

Representatives

Recent election results

References
Sources

Citations

External links
District map from the United States Census Bureau
Pennsylvania House Legislative District Maps from the Pennsylvania Redistricting Commission.  
Population Data for District 189 from the Pennsylvania Redistricting Commission.

Government of Monroe County, Pennsylvania
Government of Pike County, Pennsylvania
189